The Kap Brewster Formation is a geologic formation in Greenland. It preserves fossils dating back to the Neogene period.

See also

 List of fossiliferous stratigraphic units in Greenland

References
 

Neogene Greenland